Reidland is a census-designated place (CDP) in McCracken County, Kentucky, United States. The population was 4,491 at the 2010 census, an increase from 4,353 in 2000. It is part of the Paducah, KY-IL Micropolitan Statistical Area.

Geography

Demographics

As of the census of 2000, there were 4,353 people, 1,793 households, and 1,368 families residing in the CDP. The racial makeup of the CDP was 97.98% White, 0.30% African American, 0.14% Native American, 0.71% Asian, 0.02% Pacific Islander, 0.28% from other races, and 0.57% from two or more races. Hispanic or Latino of any race were 0.64% of the population.

There were 1,793 households, out of which 32.5% had children under the age of 18 living with them, 65.8% were married couples living together, 7.9% had a female householder with no husband present, and 23.7% were non-families. 21.5% of all households were made up of individuals, and 10.3% had someone living alone who was 65 years of age or older. The average household size was 2.42 and the average family size was 2.81.

In the CDP, the population was spread out, with 22.4% under the age of 18, 6.1% from 18 to 24, 27.2% from 25 to 44, 28.2% from 45 to 64, and 16.1% who were 65 years of age or older. The median age was 42 years. For every 100 females, there were 94.3 males. For every 100 females age 18 and over, there were 90.1 males.

The median income for a household in the CDP was $48,341, and the median income for a family was $54,622. Males had a median income of $45,459 versus $21,915 for females. The per capita income for the CDP was $22,120. About 2.9% of families and 4.4% of the population were below the poverty line, including 4.3% of those under age 18 and 7.1% of those age 65 or over.

Distinction
In the March 2015 edition of Business Insider, Reidland was mentioned as the Most Affordable Small Town in Kentucky.

References

Census-designated places in McCracken County, Kentucky
Census-designated places in Kentucky
Paducah micropolitan area
Kentucky populated places on the Tennessee River